Tom Craig was a Scottish football player during the 1950s and 1960s. He started his career with junior side Kirkintilloch Rob Roy before signing 'senior' with Dumbarton. Here he played with distinction, being a constant in the half back line for over four seasons. In 1960, he transferred to East Stirling where he served for eight seasons (including the 1964–65 season with E.S. Clydebank). He saw out his career where he started with 'Rob Roy'.

References 

Scottish footballers
Dumbarton F.C. players
East Stirlingshire F.C. players
Scottish Football League players
Year of birth missing
Kirkintilloch Rob Roy F.C. players
Association football wing halves